Harold Laurance (1 July 1915 – 17 January 2004) was a British weightlifter. He competed in the men's middleweight event at the 1936 Summer Olympics.

References

External links
 

1915 births
2004 deaths
British male weightlifters
Olympic weightlifters of Great Britain
Weightlifters at the 1936 Summer Olympics